TPTP is an abbreviation and may refer to

 Thousands of Problems for Theorem Provers
 Test & Performance Tools Platform, a platform of Eclipse